Fred G. McCall, Jr. (August 12, 1923 – March 28, 2008) was the head basketball coach at Campbell University in Buies Creek, North Carolina from 1953 to 1969.  He later served as an administrator of the University.  Along with Bones McKinney, he co-founded the first basketball school at Campbell in 1956, which later featured instructors such as John Wooden.  McCall also invented the McCall Rebounder as a practice tool for basketball.

McCall was the father of Leah McCall Devlin.

References
 

1923 births
2008 deaths
Baseball players from North Carolina
Basketball coaches from North Carolina
Basketball players from North Carolina
Campbell Fighting Camels and Lady Camels athletic directors
Campbell Fighting Camels basketball coaches
Lenoir–Rhyne Bears baseball players
Lenoir–Rhyne Bears football players
Lenoir–Rhyne Bears men's basketball players
Newton-Conover Twins players
Peabody College alumni
People from Denver, North Carolina
Rocky Mount Rocks players
American men's basketball players